The United States National Water and Climate Center collects and disseminates water resources and climate data.

It is part of the Natural Resources Conservation Service of the United States Department of Agriculture (USDA).  The offices are located in Portland, Oregon, near Lloyd Center.

Services include:
 Operates the SNOTEL network which controls and collects data from more than 730 automated snowpack and climate sensor sites.

References

External links 
 National Water and Climate Center Official site

Federal Statistical System of the United States
Irrigation in the United States
Natural resources agencies in the United States
National statistical services
Statistical organizations in the United States
United States Department of Agriculture agencies
Government buildings in Portland, Oregon